Laurence School is a private coed K–6 elementary school located in Valley Glen, Los Angeles, California.

References

External links
Official website

Private elementary schools in California
Schools in Los Angeles
Valley Glen, Los Angeles